Private Henry S. Finkenbiner (July 29, 1842 – June 3, 1922) was an American soldier who fought in the American Civil War. Finkenbiner received the country's highest award for bravery during combat, the Medal of Honor, for his action at Dingle's Mill in South Carolina on 9 April 1865. He was honored with the award on 30 March 1898.

Biography
Finkenbiner was born in North Industry, Ohio on 29 July 1842 the son of George and Susannah Stands Finkenbiner. He enlisted into the 107th Ohio Infantry. He served as a Corporal in Company D, 107th Ohio Volunteer Infantry Regiment (103rd OVI).

Finkenbiner and the 107th OVI spent their service with the Army of the Potomac until August 1863 when they transferred to the Department of the South and operated there until the end of the war. He was awarded the Medal of Honor for action on April 9, 1865, at Dingles Mill, South Carolina.

After the war he returned to Ohio and in 1868, married Amanda Ellen Stoops Finkenbiner (1848–1882) with whom he had seven children, four girls (two of whom died in childhood) and three boys:
 Dora Emmett Finkenbiner 1869–1940
 George Elmer Finkenbiner 1871–1943
 Ida M Finkenbiner Grindle 1873–1914
 Daisy Nevada Finkenbiner 1875–1877
 John Stands Finkenbiner 1876–1949
 Arthur Clinton Finkenbiner 1879–1965
 Minnie Myrtle Finkenbiner 1882–1893

After her death, he married Nancy Eliza Miller Finkenbiner 1858–1911 with whom he had a son:
 Walter Howard Finkenbiner 1886–1931

He received his Medal of Honor on March 30, 1898.

In 1911, his second wife, Nancy, passed away, and he married a third time to a widow, Lorane Smith Myer Finkenbiner, 1843–1917. Widowed a third time in 1917, he died on 3 June 1922 having outlived his wives and four of his children. His remains are interred at the Hopewell Cemetery in Indiana.

Medal of Honor citation

See also
List of American Civil War Medal of Honor recipients: A–F

Notes

References

External links
 

1842 births
1922 deaths
People of Ohio in the American Civil War
Union Army officers
United States Army Medal of Honor recipients
American Civil War recipients of the Medal of Honor